The Burchfield Homestead was the boyhood home of Charles E. Burchfield. It is located in Salem, Ohio and is listed on the National Register of Historic Places. Charles Burchfield was noted for his paintings of scenes in and around this home. Art historian Henry Adams, curator of American Art at the Cleveland Museum of Art, called the house “a building of extraordinary significance.”

Charles E. Burchfield

Charles Burchfield grew up in Salem, Ohio and is considered one of America's premier watercolorists. He moved to upstate New York where his career and reputation as an artist flourished. The neighborhood and home in Salem where he was raised have not significantly changed since Burchfield lived there. The inspiration for many of his works were the scenes visible from the windows of the home.

Burchfield Homestead Museum
In August 1999, the Burchfield Museum opened after years of fund-raising and construction to restore Burchfield's home.

The Burchfield Museum was placed on the National Register of Historical Places in April 1999.

References

External links
 Burchfield Homestead Society

Houses on the National Register of Historic Places in Ohio
Museums in Columbiana County, Ohio
National Register of Historic Places in Columbiana County, Ohio
Houses in Columbiana County, Ohio
Historic house museums in Ohio
Art museums and galleries in Ohio
Charles Burchfield